Zaltoprofen (JAN; trade name Soleton) is a nonsteroidal anti-inflammatory drug (NSAID) used as an analgesic, antipyretic, and anti-inflammatory agent.  It is a selective COX-2 inhibitor and also inhibits bradykinin-induced pain responses without blocking bradykinin receptors.

It was approved for use in Japan in 1993.

References 

COX-2 inhibitors
Nonsteroidal anti-inflammatory drugs
Carboxylic acids